In the German state of Mecklenburg-Western Pomerania (German: Mecklenburg-Vorpommern) there are 84 officially recognised towns and cities.

 17 cities in Landkreis Mecklenburgische Seenplatte
 16 cities in Landkreis Ludwigslust-Parchim
 14 cities in Landkreis Vorpommern-Greifswald
 13 cities in Landkreis Rostock
 13 cities in Landkreis Vorpommern-Rügen
 9 cities in Landkreis Nordwestmecklenburg

In addition there are the two district-free cities of Rostock and Schwerin.

District capitals 
There are 6 district capitals in the state of Mecklenburg-Vorpommern:
 Greifswald (Landkreis Vorpommern-Greifswald) Hanseatic city
 Güstrow (Landkreis Rostock)
 Neubrandenburg (Landkreis Mecklenburgische Seenplatte)
 Parchim (Landkreis Ludwigslust-Parchim)
 Stralsund (Landkreis Vorpommern-Rügen) Hanseatic city
 Wismar (Landkreis Nordwestmecklenburg) Hanseatic city

Table
You can sort the table by clicking one of the upper columns.

Former cities on the current territory of Mecklenburg-Vorpommern

Sources 

 
Cities
MV
 
 
Mecklenburg-Vorpommern
Tourist attractions in Mecklenburg-Western Pomerania